This list of Vogue Arabia cover models is a catalog of cover models who have appeared on the cover of Vogue Arabia, the Arabian edition of Vogue magazine, starting with the magazine's first issue in March 2017.

2017

2018

2019

2020

2021

2022

References

External links

Arabia